Driving Madeleine is a 2022 French-Belgian drama film directed by Christian Carion.

Premise
The film stars Line Renaud as Madeleine, an elderly woman in Paris who is moving into a nursing home; en route, she asks taxi driver Charles (Dany Boon) to detour to various locations around the city that have meant something to her in her life.

Cast
 Line Renaud as Madeleine
 Dany Boon as Charles
 Alice Isaaz as Young Madeleine
 Jérémie Laheurte as Ray
 Gwendoline Hamon as Denise
 Julie Delarme as Karine
 Thomas Alden as Mathieu
 Hadriel Roure as Young Mathieu

Production
The film entered production in spring 2021.

Release
The film premiered on 23 August 2022 at the Angoulême Film Festival. It was also screened as a special presentation at the 2022 Toronto International Film Festival, before going into commercial release on 21 September.

References

External links

2022 films
2022 drama films
2020s French-language films
2020s drama road movies
French drama road movies
Films about old age
Films about taxis
Films directed by Christian Carion
Films set in Paris
Films shot in Paris
Pathé films
2020s French films